Force: Five is a 1981 film directed by Robert Clouse. Its stars are Joe Lewis and Bong Soo Han, and it is a loose remake of the 1976 Jim Kelly action film, Hot Potato.

Plot
A top government agent assembles a force of five martial arts experts to carry out a near-impossible assignment. They must topple the corrupt organization behind one of the world's wealthiest and most powerful religious leaders.

Cast
Joe Lewis as Jim Martin
Bong Soo Han as Rev. Rhee
Sonny Barnes as Lockjaw
Richard Norton as Ezekiel
Benny Urquidez as Billy Ortega
Amanda Wyss as Cindy Lester (as Mandy Wyss)
Joe Corley (uncredited)

Video Release

On February 11, 2014, Scorpion Releasing released Force: Five on DVD.

References

External links

1981 films
American martial arts films
Films directed by Robert Clouse
Remakes of American films
1981 martial arts films
1980s English-language films
1980s American films